The men's high jump at the 2011 IPC Athletics World Championships was held at the QEII Stadium on 27–29 January.

Medalists

F13
The Men's high jump, F13 was held on January 28

Classification F13 - visual impairment
F13: visual acuity ranges from 2/60 to 6/60 and/or visual field over 5 degrees and less than 20 degrees.

The event also included athletes with a F12 classification - visual impairment
F12: may recognise the shape of a hand and have a visual acuity of 2/60 and/or visual field of less than 5 degrees.

Results

Final

Key:  CR = Championship Record, SB = Season Best, NM = No Mark

F42
The Men's high jump, F42 was held on January 29

F42 = single above knee amputation or equivalent impairments.

Results

Final

Key:  SB = Seasonal best, AR = Area Record

F46
The Men's high jump, F46 was held on January 27

F46 =  single above or below elbow amputation, or equivalent impairment.

Results

Final

Key:  AR = Area Record, SB = Seasonal best

See also
List of IPC world records in athletics

References
General
Schedule and results, Official site of the 2011 IPC Athletics World Championships
IPC Athletics Classification Explained, Scottish Disability Sport
Specific

High jump
High jump at the World Para Athletics Championships